Zuhayr ibn Al-Qayn Al-Bajalī, was a member of the Bajila tribe in Iraq and a companion of Husayn ibn Ali, Muhammad's grandson and son of Ali ibn Abi Talib. He was martyred during the battle of Karbala in Karbala.

Battle of Karbala
Zuhayr ibn al-Qayn is best known for his participation in the Battle of Karbala. Despite the fact that he did not want to even speak to Husayn, he eventually spoke to him when his tribe met his companions and his wife influenced him into speaking with Husayn. After meeting Husayn, Zuhayr divorced his wife (so that she could remarry after his martyrdom) and volunteered to join his army against the forces of Yazid I.

In the morning of Ashura, he suggested to Husayn ibn Ali that: "fighting these people, now, will be easier for us than fighting those who will come against us after them." Husayn replied: "I will not begin to fight against them." In the battle, the right side of Husayn ibn Ali's army was commanded by Zuhayr ibn al-Qayn.

When Zuhayr was called back from fighting to pray, Husayn ibn Ali asked him and a few other men to hold a shield and protect the women and men who are praying. Zuhayr stood in front of the Imam and blocked every arrow shot at him. Zuhayr found 2 arrows on his chest and his arm.

Death
Zuhayr was killed in the battle of Karbala when two men under Shimr's command speared him from the back and the front side. It is said that (before he was martyred) he managed to defeat 100 men single-handedly.

See also

 Abbas ibn Ali
 Qasim ibn Hasan
 Muslim ibn Aqil
 Burayr ibn Khudayr al-Hamdani
 List of casualties in Husayn's army at the Battle of Karbala

References

People killed at the Battle of Karbala
680 deaths
Year of birth unknown